Ioan Chirilă (25 October 1925 – 21 November 1999) was a Romanian sports broadcaster and sports writer. The  Ioan Chirilă Awards are named in his honour. He was married to actress Iarina Demian with whom he had two sons: Ionuț who is a football coach and Tudor who is a singer.

References

1925 births
1999 deaths
Romanian sportswriters
Romanian journalists
20th-century Romanian writers
Romanian male writers
20th-century Romanian male writers
20th-century journalists